Galaxy 4R was a communications satellite operated by PanAmSat from 2000 to 2006, and by Intelsat from 2006 to 2009. It spent most of its operational life at an orbital location of 99° W, a slot once occupied by the Galaxy IV, which suffered a failure in 1998. G4R was launched on April 18, 2000, with an Ariane launch vehicle, and covered North America with twenty-four transponders each on the C- and Ku bands. The satellite is currently at 76.8°W, inclined.

Users included Warner Brothers, National Public Radio, Public Radio International, Buena Vista Television Distribution, FOX, and Televisa.  The satellite was also utilized for satellite internet services through DirecPC.

Much of the Ku side was occupied by the HITS service, which re-distributes programming found on other satellites to cable providers.

Designed for an operational lifespan of 15 years, Galaxy 4R suffered a propulsion system failure in 2003 and was replaced by Galaxy 16 on August 14, 2006. It was moved to 76.85 degrees west after being replaced and its orbit was allowed to become more inclined in order to save station-keeping propellant. The satellite was decommissioned in April 2009 and moved to a graveyard orbit.

References

External links 

 

Satellites using the BSS-601 bus
Communications satellites in geostationary orbit
Spacecraft launched in 2000
Spacecraft decommissioned in 2009
Derelict satellites orbiting Earth